Jack Drury (born February 3, 2000) is an American professional ice hockey center for the  Carolina Hurricanes of the National Hockey League (NHL). Drury was selected 42nd overall by the Hurricanes in the 2018 NHL Entry Draft.

Early years
Drury was born in New York City while his father, Ted, was playing for the New York Islanders. His family relocated to Wilmette, Illinois and then settled in Winnetka, Illinois. Drury attended Loyola Academy during his first two years of high school before attending Waterloo West High School after joining the Waterloo Black Hawks.

Playing career

Amateur
Drury in his youth played for the Chicago Mission before joining the Waterloo Black Hawks of the United States Hockey League (USHL) before joining the Harvard Crimson men's ice hockey team. Following his sophomore season at Harvard, Drury was selected to the All-ECAC second team.

Professional
On June 24, 2018, Drury was selected by the Carolina Hurricanes with the 42nd overall pick in the 2018 NHL Entry Draft.

In the 2020–21 season, with the ongoing COVID-19 pandemic affecting the commencement of the collegiate season, Drury opted to leave Harvard and signed a one-year deal with Swedish club, the Växjö Lakers of the Swedish Hockey League (SHL). In his first professional season, Drury registered 10 goals and 30 points in 41 regular season games and was named one of three finalists for the SHL's Rookie of the Year award. He continued his impressive play in the post-season, finishing second in the league with 11 points in 14 playoff games as Växjö Lakers won the Le Mat Trophy.

On July 8, 2021, Drury returned to North America in agreeing to a three-year, entry-level contract with his draft club, the Carolina Hurricanes.

Personal life
Drury's father, Ted, played for eight seasons in the National Hockey League. His uncle is former professional hockey player Chris Drury, who currently serves as general manager for the New York Rangers. Drury's mother, Liz Berkery Drury, played collegiate lacrosse at Harvard and helped the Crimson win a NCAA Championship in 1990. Both of his parents were inducted into the Harvard Athletics Hall of Fame in 2008. Drury also has three brothers, Owen, Teddy, and Ryan, and a sister, Lilly.

Career statistics

Regular season and playoffs

International

Awards and honors

References

External links
 

2000 births
Living people
American men's ice hockey centers
Carolina Hurricanes draft picks
Carolina Hurricanes players
Chicago Wolves players
Harvard Crimson men's ice hockey players
Ice hockey players from Illinois
Ice hockey players from New York (state)
People from Winnetka, Illinois
Sportspeople from New York City
Växjö Lakers players
Waterloo Black Hawks players